The 2018–19 Pepperdine Waves women's basketball team represents Pepperdine University in the 2018–19 NCAA Division I women's basketball season. The Waves, as members of the West Coast Conference, were led by second year head coach DeLisha Milton-Jones. The Waves play their home games at the Firestone Fieldhouse on the university campus in Malibu, California. They finished the season 22–12, 12–6 in WCC play to finish in a tie for third place. They advanced to the semifinals of the WCC women's tournament where they lost to Gonzaga. They received an automatic bid to the Women's National Invitation Tournament where defeated California Baptist and WCC member Saint Mary's in the second round before losing to Wyoming in the third round.

Roster

Schedule

|-
!colspan=9 style=| Regular season

|-
!colspan=9 style=| WCC Women's Tournament

|-
!colspan=9 style=| WNIT

See also
 2018–19 Pepperdine Waves men's basketball team

References

Pepperdine
Pepperdine Waves women's basketball seasons
Pepperdine
Pepperdine
Pepperdine